In algebra, Hua's identity named after Hua Luogeng, states that for any elements a, b in a division ring,

whenever . Replacing  with  gives another equivalent form of the identity:

Hua's theorem
The identity is used in a proof of Hua's theorem, which states that if  is a function between division rings satisfying

then  is a homomorphism or an antihomomorphism. This theorem is connected to the fundamental theorem of projective geometry.

Proof of the identity
One has

References 

 
 

Theorems in algebra